"Bumblebeee" (stylised as "bumblebeee") is a song by English rock band Kasabian - the second single from their fifth studio album, 48:13. The single was released on 3 August 2014 as the follow-up to 48:13's lead single, "eez-eh". It peaked at #165 on the UK Singles Chart. The b-side, "gelfling", is named after the characters from the film The Dark Crystal, and is an electronic track without any main vocals.

Composition
Sergio Pizzorno described the song as having a "Beastie Boys dub with a sort of Zeppelin, Rage Against the Machine chorus". "bumblebee" was the first track to be written for 48:13.

It is one of the few tracks where Tom Meighan and Sergio Pizzorno share lead vocals, with the former singing the verses and the latter singing the chorus.

Promotion
"bumblebeee" was Kasabian's opening track during their set as headliners at Glastonbury 2014. The track has also been the opener for the majority of gigs for the 48:13 tour. The band have performed acoustic versions of "bumblebeee" on various occasions. On 12 September 2014, they performed the song on the first episode of series thirteen of Alan Carr: Chatty Man.

Video
The video for "bumblebeee" was released on 27 July 2014, having been accidentally released and subsequently deleted on 23 July. The video features the band all in white on a white background and various scenes show Meighan crowdsurfing and stampedes of men and dogs.

Personnel
Kasabian
 Tom Meighan – lead vocals (verses)
 Sergio Pizzorno – lead vocals (choruses), guitar, synthesizers, programming, production
 Chris Edwards – bass
 Ian Matthews – drums
Additional personnel
 Tim Carter – acoustic and electric guitars

Charts

References 

Kasabian songs
2014 singles
2014 songs
Songs written by Sergio Pizzorno
Columbia Records singles